Terminalia is a genus of large trees of the flowering plant family Combretaceae, comprising nearly 300 species distributed in tropical regions of the world. The genus name derives from the Latin word terminus, referring to the fact that the leaves appear at the very tips of the shoots.

Selected species

There are 282 accepted Terminalia species as of April 2021 according to Plants of the World Online. Selected species include:

Terminalia acuminata (Fr. Allem.) Eichl.
Terminalia albida Scott-Elliot
Terminalia amazonia (J.F.Gmel.) Exell – white olive
Terminalia arbuscula Sw.
Terminalia archipelagi Coode
Terminalia arjuna (Roxb. ex DC.) Wight & Arn. – arjuna, koha, white marudah
Terminalia arostrata Ewart & O.B.Davies – crocodile tree
Terminalia australis Cambess – palo amarillo, tanimbú
Terminalia avicennioides
Terminalia bellirica  (Gaertn.) Roxb. – beleric
Terminalia bialata (Roxb.) Steud. – Indian silver greywood, silver greywood
Terminalia buceras 
Terminalia bucidoides Standley & L.O.Williams
Terminalia bursarina  – Bendee
Terminalia calamansanai (Blanco) Rolfe
Terminalia cambodiana Gagnep.
Terminalia canescens (DC.) Radlk. – jalool
Terminalia carolinensis Kaneh.
Terminalia catappa L. – Indian almond, tropical almond, umbrella tree
Terminalia chebula Retz. – black myrobalan, chebulic myrobalan, inknut
Terminalia cherrieri McKee
Terminalia circumalata F.Muell.	
Terminalia cunninghamii C.A.Gardner – Pindan quondong	
Terminalia eddowesii Coode
Terminalia engleri Gere & Boatwr. – terenifù (West Africa to Cameroon)
Terminalia elliptica Willd. – Indian-laurel
Terminalia eriostachya A.Rich.
Terminalia ferdinandiana Exell – billygoat plum, Kakadu plum, gubinge
Terminalia fitzgeraldii C.A.Gardner
Terminalia grandiflora Benth.
Terminalia hadleyana W.Fitzg.
Terminalia ivorensis A.Chev. – idigbo, black afara, blackbark, brimstone wood, shingle wood
Terminalia januariensis DC.
Terminalia kaernbachii Warb. – okari nut
Terminalia kangeanensis Slooten
Terminalia kuhlmannii Alwan & Stace
Terminalia kumpaja R.L.Barrett
Terminalia latifolia Sw.
Terminalia latipes Benth.
Terminalia littoralis L.
Terminalia macroptera Guill. & Perr.
Terminalia microcarpa Decne.
Terminalia myriocarpa
Terminalia neotaliala – Madagascar almond tree
Terminalia nigrovenulosa Pierre
Terminalia nitens C.Presl
Terminalia novocaledonica Däniker
Terminalia oblongata F.Muell.
Terminalia paniculata Roth
Terminalia parviflora Thwaites
Terminalia pellucida C.Presl
Terminalia petiolaris Benth. – maroolTerminalia phillyreifolia (Van Heurck & Müll.Arg.) Gere & Boatwr.Terminalia platyphylla F.Muell.Terminalia platyptera F.Muell.Terminalia porphyrocarpaTerminalia reitzii ExcellTerminalia rerei CoodeTerminalia richii A.GrayTerminalia schimperiana Hochst.Terminalia sericea Burch. ex DC. – silver terminaliaTerminalia superba Engl. & Diels – limbaTerminalia volucris'' Benth.

References

 
Myrtales genera
Medicinal plants